Music to Crash Your Car To: Vol. 2 is the sixth Mötley Crüe compilation album containing songs from the band's later work. It collects the albums Dr. Feelgood and Mötley Crüe, the EP Quaternary, and the compilations Decade of Decadence 81-91 and Supersonic and Demonic Relics.

Content 
The box set contains a rare comic book reprinting a 1989 issue of Rock 'N' Roll Comics and a double sided poster, one with the cover art and the other with the Decade of Decadence cover art. The album been ridiculed in the press for the title, considering the legal troubles of Vince Neil with regard to his drunk driving and vehicular manslaughter charge. The albums Generation Swine, Greatest Hits,  and New Tattoo are not included.

Track listing 
Disc 1
"T.N.T. (Terror 'N Tinseltown)"
"Dr. Feelgood"
"Slice of Your Pie"
"Rattlesnake Shake"
"Kickstart My Heart"
"Without You"
"Same Ol' Situation (S.O.S.)"
"Sticky Sweet"
"She Goes Down"
"Don't Go Away Mad (Just Go Away)"
"Time for Change"
"Dr. Feelgood" (Demo)
"Without You" (Demo)
"Kickstart My Heart" (Demo)
"Get it for Free"
"Time for Change" (Demo)

Disc 2
"Live Wire" (Kick Ass '91 Remix)
"Piece of Your Action" (Screamin' '91 Remix)
"Black Widow"
"Sinners and Saints"
"Knock 'Em Dead, Kid" (Demo)
"Mood Ring"
"Home Sweet Home '91"
"So Good, So Bad"
"Monsterous"
"Say Yeah"
"Kickstart My Heart" (Live)
"Dr. Feelgood" (Live)
"Teaser"
"Rock 'N' Roll Junkie"
"Primal Scream"
"Angela"
"Anarchy in the U.K."

Disc 3
"Power to the Music"
"Uncle Jack"
"Hooligan's Holiday"
"Misunderstood"
"Loveshine"
"Poison Apples"
"Hammered"
"Til Death Do Us Part"
"Welcome to the Numb"
"Smoke the Sky"
"Droppin Like Flies"
"Driftaway"
"Hypnotized"

Disc 4
"Planet Boom"
"Bittersuite"
"Father"
"Friends"
"Babykills"
"10,000 Miles Away"
"Hooligan's Holiday" (Extended Holiday Version by Skinny Puppy)
"Hammered"
"Livin' in the Know"
"Misunderstood" (Guitar Solo/Scream Version)
"Hooligan's Holiday" (Derelict Version)
"Misunderstood" (Successful Format Version)
"Hooligan's Holiday" (Brown Nose Edit)

References

External links 

2004 compilation albums
Mötley Crüe compilation albums